Adultcon is a pornographic film trade fair in the United States. The event takes place three times per year, usually with two conferences in Los Angeles, California at the Los Angeles Convention Center, and one conference in Las Vegas Valley, Nevada. The event was established in 2001.

Adultcon hosted an Adultcon award ceremony in 2007. Although they announced a subsequent ceremony for 2008, it did not come to fruition.

In July 2011, Adultcon canceled its two shows in Los Angeles because the Los Angeles Convention Center hosted two competing pornography conferences around the same times of year.

On May 19, 2016, Adultcon in Los Angeles reported an attendance of 10,000 fans.

References

Erotic events
Las Vegas Valley conventions and trade shows
Trade shows in the United States
2001 establishments in the United States